Bounty Wars is an American reality television series on the Discovery Channel that debuted on July 8, 2012. Only one episode of the series aired, and has since been cancelled.

Episodes

References

External links

2010s American reality television series
2012 American television series debuts
2012 American television series endings
English-language television shows
Discovery Channel original programming
Television series canceled after one episode